Marin Glavaš (born 17 March 1992) is a Croatian professional footballer who plays as a winger, currently playing for UFC Markt Allhau in the Austrian fourth tier-Burgenlandliga.

Club career
Glavaš, originally from Imotski, moved to Osijek aged 15. He made his league debut on 6 August 2011 in a 4–0 home win against NK Zagreb, at 19 years of age, coming in for Srđan Vidaković in the 84th minute. He scored his first league goal in the 2–0 home win against Hajduk Split on 24 August 2014.

In February 2016, Glavaš joined Ararat Yerevan for their training camp in the United States, joining them permanently on 24 February.

In March 2017, Glavaš signed for Finnish second tier club Oulu for the 2017 season.

After spending 2 years in Austria playing for four different clubs, Glavaš signed a six month contract with a possibility of a two year extension with Bosnian Premier League club Široki Brijeg on 23 January 2020. He made his official debut for Široki Brijeg in a 3–2 away win against Mladost Doboj Kakanj on 29 February 2020. Glavaš left Široki Brijeg on 10 June 2020 after his contract with the club expired.

References

External links

Marin Glavaš at Sportnet.hr 
Marin Glavaš at Flashscore

1992 births
Living people
Sportspeople from Imotski
Association football wingers
Croatian footballers
Croatia youth international footballers
NK Osijek players
FC ViOn Zlaté Moravce players
FC Ararat Yerevan players
NK Celje players
AC Oulu players
SV Allerheiligen players
SV Horn players
SC Weiz players
NK Široki Brijeg players
NK Krško players
Croatian Football League players
Slovak Super Liga players
Armenian Premier League players
Slovenian PrvaLiga players
Ykkönen players
Austrian Regionalliga players
2. Liga (Austria) players
Premier League of Bosnia and Herzegovina players
Slovenian Second League players
Austrian Landesliga players
Croatian expatriate footballers
Expatriate footballers in Slovakia
Croatian expatriate sportspeople in Slovakia
Expatriate footballers in Armenia
Croatian expatriate sportspeople in Armenia
Expatriate footballers in Slovenia
Croatian expatriate sportspeople in Slovenia
Expatriate footballers in Finland
Croatian expatriate sportspeople in Finland
Expatriate footballers in Austria
Croatian expatriate sportspeople in Austria